Franco Catarozzi Parafita (born 2 April 2000) is a Uruguayan professional footballer who plays as a midfielder for Montevideo City Torque.

Career
A youth academy graduate of Montevideo City Torque, Catarozzi made his professional debut on 4 February 2021 in a goalless draw against Defensor Sporting. He scored his first goal on 15 April 2021 in a 2–0 Copa Sudamericana win against Fénix.

Career statistics

References

External links
 

2000 births
Living people
Footballers from Montevideo
Uruguayan people of Italian descent
Association football midfielders
Uruguayan footballers
Uruguayan Primera División players
Montevideo City Torque players